Richard Ntomba Ekunde (born 4 August 1982 in Kinshasa) is a Congolese footballer who plays for FC Trollhättan as a defender.

Career
He was one of five Congolese players recruited from Kinshasa City by Djurgårdens IF in 2002. In 2003 the reigning Swedish champions loaned him out to their associate club Åtvidabergs FF. Before the 2005 season the move to Åtvidaberg was made permanent.

In December 2005 Ekunde signed a three-year deal with Gothenburg club GAIS and has, barring injuries, been a starting player for them ever since. In 2007, he was given the GAIS player of the year award and also extended his contract to the end of 2012.

On 20 March 2013 Ekunde signed a contract with the Norwegian club Viking.

In March 2014, Ekunde resigned for GAIS.

References

External links

GAIS profile

1982 births
Living people
Democratic Republic of the Congo footballers
Democratic Republic of the Congo international footballers
Democratic Republic of the Congo under-20 international footballers
Democratic Republic of the Congo expatriate footballers
Åtvidabergs FF players
GAIS players
Viking FK players
Allsvenskan players
Superettan players
Eliteserien players
Expatriate footballers in Sweden
Expatriate footballers in Norway
Democratic Republic of the Congo expatriate sportspeople in Sweden
Democratic Republic of the Congo expatriate sportspeople in Norway
Association football defenders
Footballers from Kinshasa